The biblical patriarch Isaac ( or  ) is recognized as a prophet and messenger of God by Muslims. As in Judaism and Christianity, Islam maintains that Isaac was the son of the patriarch and prophet Abraham from his wife Sarah. Muslims hold Isaac in deep veneration because they believe that both Isaac and his older half-brother Ishmael continued their father's spiritual legacy through their subsequent preaching of the message of God after the death of Abraham. Isaac is mentioned in fifteen passages of the Quran. Along with being mentioned several times in the Quran, Isaac is held up as one of Islam's prophets.

Early life
Because of Allah's grace and covenant with Abraham, Sarah was gifted with a child in her old age. Isaac was the age of 10 when his half-brother Ishmael went out from Abraham's house into the desert. While in the desert Ishmael took a wife of the daughters of Moab named ʿAʾishah.

In the Quran

Isaac is mentioned fifteen times by name in the Quran, often with his father and his son, Jacob (Yaʿqūb). The Quran states that Abraham received "good tidings of Isaac, a prophet, of the righteous", and that God blessed them both (37: 112). "And We gave him glad tidings of Isaac, a prophet from among the righteous. And We blessed him and Isaac. And among their progeny are the virtuous and those who clearly wrong themselves"  In a fuller description, when angels came to Ibrahim to tell him of the future punishment to be imposed on Sodom and Gomorrah, his wife, Sarah, "laughed, and We gave her good tidings of Isaac, and after Isaac of (a grandson) Jacob" (11: 71-74); and it is further explained that this event will take place despite Abraham and Sarah's old age. Several verses speak of Isaac as a "gift" to Abraham (6: 84; 19: 49-50), and 29: 26-27 adds that God made "prophethood and the Book to be among his offspring", which has been interpreted to refer to Abraham's two prophetic sons, his prophetic grandson Jacob, and his prophetic great-grandson Joseph. In the Quran, it later narrates that Abraham also praised God for giving him Ishmael and Isaac in his old age (XIV: 39-41).

Elsewhere in the Quran, Isaac is mentioned in lists: Joseph follows the religion of his forefathers Abraham, Isaac and Jacob (12: 38) and speaks of God's favor to them (12: 6); Yaʿqūb's sons all testify their faith and promise to worship the God that their forefathers, "Abraham, Ishmael and Isaac", worshiped (2: 127); and the Quran commands Muslims to believe in the revelations that were given to "Abraham, Ishmael, Isaac, Jacob and the Patriarchs" (2: 136; III: 84).

Burial site

His tomb and that of his wife Rebekah is considered to be in the Cave of the Patriarchs in Hebron, the West Bank, known in Islam as the Ibrahim-i-Mosque ("Mosque of Abraham"). Alongside Isaac's tomb are those of some of the other Qur'anic/Biblical patriarchs and their wives: Abraham and Sarah and Jacob and Leah.

See also
 Biblical narratives and the Quran
 Prophets of Islam
 Stories of The Prophets

Footnotes

   is the traditional Quranic spelling after vocalizing with a super script .  In Modern Standard Arabic, it is normally written ; IPA: .

Bibliography
 C.H. Becker, Islamstudien, i, 47
 ZDMG, xxxii, 359, ii
 Encyclopedia of Islam, W. M. Watt, Ishak
 Stories of the Prophets, Kisa'i; Ibn Kathir, The Story of Isaac and Jacob

References

Islam
Hebrew Bible prophets of the Quran